Ryo may refer to:

 Ryō, a gold currency unit in pre-Meiji Japan Shakkanhō system
 Ryō (actress) (born 1973), Japanese model, actress, and singer
 Ryō (given name), a unisex Japanese given name
 Ryo, Georgia, an unincorporated community in Gordon County, in the U.S. state of Georgia

See also
 RYO (disambiguation)